Hanisch is a German surname. Notable people with the surname include:

Carol Hanisch (born 1942), American feminist
Cornelia Hanisch (born 1952), German fencer
Erich Hanisch (1909–?), German sprint canoeist
Frank Hanisch (born 1953), German footballer
Karl Hanisch (1900–?), Austrian fencer
Klaus-Peter Hanisch (1952–2009), German footballer
Reinhold Hanisch (1884–1937), Austrian painter and acquaintance of Adolf Hitler
Ted Hanisch (born 1947), Norwegian sociologist
Walter Hanisch (1916–2001), Chilean Jesuit and historian
Wolfgang Hanisch (born 1951), East German javelin thrower

German-language surnames